William Henry Stone (November 7, 1828 – July 9, 1901) was a U.S. Representative from Missouri.

Born in Shawangunk, New York, Stone attended the common schools.
He moved to St. Louis, Missouri, in 1848 and engaged in the manufacture of iron.
He became president of the St. Louis Hot Pressed Nut & Bolt Company upon its organization in 1867.
He served in the Missouri House of Representatives.
He served as member of the St. Louis Board of Water Commissioners from July 5, 1871, to November 15, 1873, when he resigned, having been elected to Congress.

Stone was elected as a Democrat to the Forty-third and Forty-fourth Congresses (March 4, 1873 – March 3, 1877).
He served as chairman of the Committee on Expenditures in the Post Office Department (Forty-fourth Congress), Committee on Manufactures (Forty-fourth Congress).
He was not a candidate for renomination in 1876 to the Forty-fifth Congress, instead resuming business interests.
He died in Asbury Park, New Jersey on July 9, 1901.
He was interred at Bellefontaine Cemetery in St. Louis, Missouri.

References

External links 
 

1828 births
1901 deaths
Democratic Party members of the Missouri House of Representatives
Democratic Party members of the United States House of Representatives from Missouri
19th-century American politicians